Xenothictis gnetivora is a species of moth of the family Tortricidae. It is found in Papua New Guinea.

The length of the forewings is 6.5–8.1 mm for males and 7.9–9.6 mm for females. The ground colour is greyish brown, reticulated (net-like pattern) with pale reddish brown and with a blackish-brown fascia from the mid-dorsum to the middle of the discal cell. The hindwings are uniform grey brown.

The larvae feed on Gnetum gnemon, Sterculia schumanniana, Celtis philippensis, Ficus nodosa, Ficus variegata, Artocarpus communis, Psychotria micralabastra and Leucosyke capitellata.

Etymology
The species name is derived from Gnetum, the genus of the most common larval host, and Latin vorare (meaning to eat).

References

	

Moths described in 2003
Archipini
Moths of Papua New Guinea
Taxa named by Marianne Horak